Famous Friends is the eighth studio album by American country music artist Chris Young. It was released on August 6, 2021, via RCA Records Nashville. It was preceded by the three singles "Raised on Country", "Drowning" and the title track. "At the End of a Bar" would be released on September 13, 2021, as the album's fourth single.

Young co-wrote all but one of the songs on the album.

Content 
"Raised on Country" was released as the leadoff single on January 28, 2019. It was originally intended to be the title track, but following the releases of "Drowning" on September 23, 2019 and "Famous Friends" on November 20, 2020, Young announced after the COVID-19 pandemic that the album would be retitled to Famous Friends.

Critical reception 
Stephen Thomas Erlewine of AllMusic wrote that Young "started drifting toward the middle of the road around the mid-2010s", but that Famous Friends "finds him making a course correction, adding some livelier, stylish elements to his smooth foundation".

Commercial performance 
Famous Friends debuted at number three on the Top Country Albums chart, as well as number 13 on the Billboard 200 chart, selling 24,000 copies (including 14,000 album units) in its first week.

Track listing

Personnel
Adapted from liner notes.

Tracks 1–4 and 10–13
Lauren Alaina – duet vocals on "Town Ain't Big Enough"
Cary Barlowe – bass guitar, electric guitar, background vocals
Kane Brown – duet vocals on "Famous Friends"
Sarah Buxton – background vocals
Dave Cohen – B-3 organ, piano, synthesizer
Corey Crowder – acoustic guitar, bass guitar, programming, background vocals
Chris DeStefano – background vocals
Hillary Lindsey – background vocals
Tony Lucido – bass guitar
Mac McAnally – acoustic guitar
Rob McNelley – electric guitar
Miles McPherson – drums
Shay Mooney – background vocals
Russell Terrell – background vocals
Derek Wells – electric guitar
Alex Wright – B-3 organ, organ, piano, synthesizer, Wurlitzer
Chris Young – lead vocals

Track 5
Josh Hoge – background vocals
Mark Holman – electric guitar, piano, programming
Miles McPherson – drums, percussion
Chris Young – lead vocals

Tracks 6–9
Chris DeStefano – acoustic guitar, banjo, bass guitar, dobro, drums, electric guitar, keyboards, piano, programming, violin, background vocals 
Ashley Gorley – background vocals
Mitchell Tenpenny – duet vocals on "At the End of a Bar"
Chris Young – lead vocals

Track 14
Dave Cohen – B-3 organ, piano, synthesizer
Wes Hightower – background vocals
Julian King – programming
Tony Lucido – bass guitar
Miles McPherson – drums, percussion
Danny Rader – acoustic guitar
Scotty Sanders – steel guitar
Derek Wells – electric guitar
Chris Young – lead vocals

Charts

Weekly charts

Year-end charts

Certifications

References 

2021 albums
Chris Young (musician) albums
RCA Records albums
Albums postponed due to the COVID-19 pandemic